The Baltis are an ethnic group of Tibetan descent who are native to the Pakistani-administered territory of Gilgit−Baltistan and in the Indian-administered territory of Ladakh, predominantly in the Kargil district with smaller concentrations present in the Leh district. Outside of the Kashmir region, Baltis are scattered throughout Pakistan, with the majority of the diaspora inhabiting prominent urban centres such as Lahore, Karachi, Islamabad and Rawalpindi.

Origin
The origin of the name Balti is unknown. The first written mention of the Balti people occurs in the 2nd century BCE by the Alexandrian astronomer and geographer Ptolemy, who refers to the region as Byaltae. The Balti people themselves refer to their native land as Balti-yul; the modern name of Baltistan is the Persian rendering of this name.

Language
The Balti language belongs to the Tibetic language family. Read (1934) considers it to be a dialect of Ladakhi, while Nicolas Tournadre (2005) instead considers it to be a sister language of Ladakhi.

Religion
Bön and Tibetan Buddhism were the dominant religions practiced by the Balti people until the arrival of Islam in Baltistan by the 14th century CE, predominantly through Sufi missionaries such as Mir Sayyid Ali Hamadani. The Noorbakshia Sufi sect further propagated the Islamic faith in the region, and most of the Balti people had converted to Islam by the end of the 17th century. Over time, a significant number of Baltis converted to Shia Islam, while a few converted to Sunni Islam.

The Baltis still retain many cultural traits of pre-Islamic Bön and Tibetan Buddhist rituals within their society, making them a unique demographic in Pakistan. The Balti language remains highly archaic and conservative, closer to Classical Tibetan than other Tibetan languages.

Baltis see congregation in mosques and Sufi Khanqahs as an important religious ritual. Khanqahs are training schools introduced by early Sufi saints who arrived in the region. The students gain spiritual purity (tazkiah) through this training (meditations and contemplations) under well-practiced spiritual guides who have already attained a certain degree of spirituality.

Mosques in Baltistan are predominantly built in the Tibetan style of architecture, though several mosques have wood-finishings and decorations in the Mughal style, which is also seen in the Kargil district of Indian-administered Ladakh, across the Line of Control.

Today, around 60% of Baltis are Shia Muslims, while some 30% practice Noorbakshia Sufi Islam, and 10% are Sunni Muslims.

In India, 97% of Baltis are Muslims and 3% of Baltis are Buddhists.

See also
 Gilgit−Baltistan
 Baltistan
 Balti language
 Balti (dish)
 Mayfung
 Tibetan Muslims
 Three Cups of Tea, a book about an American humanitarian involved in building schools in Baltistan (as part of a larger AfPak campaign)
 Sart

References

Further reading
Muhammad Yousuf Hussainabadi, 'Baltistan per aik Nazar'. 1984.
Hussainabadi, Mohamad Yusuf. Balti Zaban. 1990.
Muhammad Yousuf Hussainabadi, 'Tareekh-e-Baltistan'. 2003.
Addition of new four letter to tibetan scripts by Yusuf Hussainabadi Indian Muslim.
Akhond Muhammad Hussain Kashif "Malumaat e Gilgit Baltistan" 2013.
Shumal kay Sitarey by Ehsan Ali Danish Sermik.
Azadi e Gilgit Baltistan by Muhammad Yousuf.
Documentary film,  Fathima the Oracle (2020, dir. Geleck Palsang),  description at IMDB.com

 
Himalayan peoples
Social groups of Jammu and Kashmir
Shia communities
Muslim communities of India
Social groups of Gilgit Baltistan
Tibetan people
Ethnic groups in Pakistan